The 2015 Chinese Figure Skating Championships was held on December 27 and 28, 2014 in Changchun. Medals were awarded in the disciplines of men's singles, ladies' singles, pair skating, and ice dancing.

Results

Men

Ladies

Pairs

Ice dance

External links
 Results

Chinese Figure Skating Championships
2014 in figure skating
Chinese Figure Skating Championships, 2015
Sport in Changchun